Jean Carlos Rodríguez Quiñones (born 27 May 1999) is a Cuban football player. He plays for Pinar del Río.

Club career
He made his Cuba national football team debut on 23 June 2019 in a 2019 CONCACAF Gold Cup game against Canada.

References

External links
 
 

Living people
1999 births
Cuban footballers
Cuba international footballers
Cuba youth international footballers
Association football midfielders
FC Pinar del Río players
2019 CONCACAF Gold Cup players
People from Pinar del Río Province